Kim Min-Koo  (born 7 May 1984) is a South Korean footballer who plays as a forward.

Club career
Spending his youth career at Daegu University, Kim started his senior football career with National League side Gangneung City in 2008. During his time with Gangneung, Kim appeared in 16 league matches, scoring 12 goals. In 2009, he joined the Police FC to comply with his compulsory two-year military service.

Having completed his military service obligations, Kim was drafted in the extra pick of the 2011 K-League Draft by Daegu FC. He made his Daegu FC debut in a 0–2 League Cup loss to Gyeongnam FC on 16 March 2011, coming on as a substitute for Lee Hyung-Sang. Kim then made his K-League debut the following week in a 1–1 draw against Incheon United on 20 March 2011, again as a substitute.

Club career statistics

References

External links 

1984 births
Living people
Association football forwards
South Korean footballers
Gangneung City FC players
Korean Police FC (Semi-professional) players
Daegu FC players
K League 1 players
Korea National League players